Unnur Steinsson (born April 27, 1963) was Miss Iceland 1983 who competed in Miss Universe 1983 and came in the Top 7 position at the Miss World 1983. She is the mother of Unnur Birna Vilhjálmsdóttir who won the Miss Iceland pageant in 2005 and became Miss World 2005.

Unnur was three months pregnant when she competed in the 1983 contest, which was strictly forbidden and could lead to disqualification. Her daughter, Unnur Birna, as mentioned, won the pageant 22 years later.

External links
 Miss World official site

1963 births
Unnur Steinsson
Living people
Miss Universe 1983 contestants
Miss World 1983 delegates
Flight attendants